The Southern California Rugby Football Union (SCRFU) is the Geographical Union (GU) governing body within USA Rugby that governs adult rugby union teams in Southern California, the Las Vegas metropolitan area, Arizona, and New Mexico. The SCRFU includes numerous men's and women's,  leagues representing all levels of competitive play. College rugby is run by the college conferences and Youth Rugby is governed by Southern California Youth Rugby (SCYR). During the busiest part of the 15s seasons, southern California will have over 80 matches in a weekend. The current board of SCRFU is Geno Mazza (president), Patrick Rashidian (vice president), Kevin Holmquist (treasurer) and Bradley Davidson (secretary).

The referee society associated with SCRFU is Southern California Rugby Referee Society (SCRRS).

History
The oldest club in SCRFU is the Eagle Rock Athletic Club (founded in 1937). The second oldest is the LARC (formed in 1958 as Universities RFC, before changing their name to Los Angeles Rugby Club in 1966).

During the late-1960s and early-1970s, UCLA was the dominant college team in SCRFU, under the coaching of Dennis Storer, later the first Eagles Coach when USA Rugby was formed in 1975. The Santa Monica RFC became the dominant men's team in SCRFU throughout the mid-1970s and early-1980s.

List of SCRFU Clubs - 2018 season

Men's Division I
 Belmont Shore Rugby
 Life West Gladiators
 Old Mission Beach Athletic (San Diego) 
 Olympic Club Rugby
 San Francisco Golden Gate
 Santa Monica Dolphins

Men's Division II

Pacific South Men's D2 Group A (SoCal)
 Huntington Beach Unicorns
 Pasadena Rugby
 San Fernando Valley Rugby
 Ventura County Outlaws
 Tempe Rugby Club

Pacific South Men's D2 Group B (SoCal)
 Back Bay Sharks (Newport Beach/Costa Mesa)
 Los Angeles Rugby
 Oceanside Chiefs
 San Diego Old Aztecs

Pacific South Men's D2 Group C (AZ/SoCal)
 Las Vegas Irish
 Northern Arizona Landsharks
 Red Mountain Warthogs
 Tempe Old Devils

Men's Division II B Side

Pacific South Men's D2-B Group A
 Huntington Beach Unicorns B
 Pasadena Rugby B
 San Fernando Valley Rugby B
 Ventura County Outlaws B

Pacific South Men's D2-B Group B
 Back Bay Sharks B
 Los Angeles Rugby B
 Oceanside Chiefs B
 San Diego Old Aztecs B

Pacific South Men's D2-B Group C
 Las Vegas Irish B
 Northern Arizona Landsharks B
 Red Mountain Warthogs B
 Tempe Old Devils B

Men's Division III
 Beaumont Bluehawks
 Eagle Rock Athletic
 Kern County Rugby
 North County Gurkhas
 Orange County Ravens (San Clemente)
 Riverside Rugby
 San Luis Obispo Rugby
 Santa Barbara Grunion
 Santa Monica Dolphins D3

Men's Division IV
 Dead Rabbits Rugby
 Los Angeles Rebellion
 Oxy Olde Boys
 San Diego Armada
 South Bay Stingrays (San Diego)
 Temecula Mountain Lions

Women's Division I
 Belmont Shore Rugby
 San Diego Surfers D1
 Santa Monica Dolphins
 Tempe Ninjas

Women's Division II
 Fullerton Wolfpack
 Las Vegas Slots
 Old Pueblo Lightning
 Pasadena Rugby
 San Fernando Valley Rugby
 San Luis Obispo Rugby
 Santa Barbara Mermaids
 Ventura County Lady Outlaws

See also
Rugby union in the United States

References

External links 
 

Rugby union governing bodies in the United States
Rugby union in California
Sports organizations established in 2013
2013 establishments in the United States
Rugby union in Arizona
Sports in Las Vegas